Gerald Gordon McDougall (born March 21, 1935) is a former American Football League and Canadian Football League running back from 1957 through 1967. He was named a CFL Eastern All-Star for 1957 and 1958 while playing for the Hamilton Tiger-Cats.

References

1935 births
Living people
American Football League players
American players of Canadian football
Canadian football running backs
Edmonton Elks players
Hamilton Tiger-Cats players
Players of American football from Long Beach, California
Players of Canadian football from Long Beach, California
San Diego Chargers players
Toronto Argonauts players
UCLA Bruins football players